Muslim Rangrezz are a community of Muslim Rajputs in North India. Many members of the community migrated to Pakistan after independence and settled in Karachi, Sindh.

History and origin
The word rangrezz (رنگریز) means a dyer in the Persian language, and the community has been connected with this occupation, but in present circumstances, its members are involved in different trades and other business activities. Many now claim Central Asian descent, and it is quite possible that only some may be of Turkic ancestry. They are pathan converts and they may be converts from the Hindu Rajputs, according to their family genealogical records maintained or it is more likely that some members of the community are of foreign origin, who over time have evolved into a community which is now bound by rules of endogamy. They are now associated with the printing of clothes.

Rangrezz of India do not have the same DNA intermixing as Pathans and Sayyids, it meaning they are pagan converts and have many things to do with Muslim Rajpoots, Mewati or Kayamkhani as their skin tone and facial features are of an australoid type.

They have the three subdivision, the Lalgarh, Nilgarh and Muslim Chhipi, and speak Urdu as well as local dialects of Hindi. The basis of these social divisions is occupation. In this social hierarchy, the Chhipi are placed in the lowest position, because they dyed and printed clothes, whereas the Lalgarh and Nilgarh generally prepare colour from indigo. In fact, the Muslim Chhipi form a distinct endogamous sub-group within the larger Rangrezz community. The word Rangrezz has now been replaced by the word Sabbagh, which is an Arabic word meaning "garden". They are a Sunni Muslim community. They also visit the shrines of various Sufi saints found in North India, such as Khwaja Moinuddin Chishti.

Distribution
The Rangrez are found in the states of Uttar Pradesh, Bihar, Madhya Pradesh, Delhi and Rajasthan.

Quite a few Rangrez have migrated to Pakistan, where they form an important element in the Muhajir community.

Present circumstances

In Uttar Pradesh 
In Uttar Pradesh, they are a landless community, involved in textiles and printing. Many have given up their traditional occupation, and recent surveys show only ten percent are still involved in their traditional occupation. Many have now adopted different other occupation Rangrez specially in Rohilkhand Region are substantial land owner and involve in different types of trade. In Pilibhit District Tehsil Puranpur where Rangrez have sizable population and are well to do Rangrez also have sizable population in Bareilly district. Tehsil baheri have good numbers of population where its members are businessmen. Rangrez Community also live in Kanpur, Auraiya, Etawah, Agra and Agra's Tehsil Bah & Fatehabad, Firozabad, Alighar, Etah Kasganj. Mujaffarnagar, Sharanpur, and its sub district. Its members are reasonably educated, businessman and have government jobs. 
They live in multi-caste and multi-religious villages, but occupy their own distinct quarters. Most speak Urdu, as well as local dialects of Hindi, such as Awadhi.

The Rangrez have their own council of elders to deal with matters relating to the community. This caste council or panchayat deals with issues such as elopement, fights, thefts and disrespect of community norms. The caste council has an elected president, secretary and treasurer, and no longer operates as a traditional caste council. They are an endogamous community, and cross cousin and parallel cousin marriages are prevalent. Traditionally marriages take place between the Lalgarh and Nilgarh sub-groups, but not with the Muslim Chhipi. These three sub-groups are further divided into biradaris, clans which claim descent from a common ancestor. Marriages are preferred within the biradaris. Important biradaris include the Saiyed, Chipa, Chandelwal, Ghosi, Siddiqi, Usmani, Shaikh and Khatri.

In Rajasthan 
In Rajasthan, the community claim to have come from Delhi during the rule of Mohammad Ghori.   They are found mainly in Alwar, Jaipur, Sikar and Sawai Madhopur districts. The community is sub-divided into several clans, known as gotras, the main ones being Khilji, Chauhan, Bagadiya, Tughlaq Singhania, Ghori, Solanki, Arab, Salampariya and Sabuka, Jajodia. They maintain a system of clan exogamy, which a practice unique to the Rajasthan Rangrez. The Rangrez are involved mainly involved in the trading and printing of clothes. Like in Uttar Pradesh, the Rajasthan Rangrez live in multi-caste and multi-religious villages, but maintain a social distance with neighbouring Muslim castes such as the Meo and Manihar. Behlim Rangrez is the oldest Muslim gotra in India. They came with Mahmood Ghaznavi in his Indian campaign. They were mostly Persians, Turks and Arabs. Most Behaleem Rangrez migrated to Pakistan during Independence (1947).

In Bihar 
In Bihar, they are found in the districts of Patna, Siwan, Saran, Munger, Gaya, Bhagalpur and Muzaffarpur. Muzaffarpur has the second largest population of rangrez caste. Muzaffarpur has its own committee led by Jahangir Rangrez as President and Abdul Rashid Rangrez as Secretary. They speak Urdu, as well as Magadhi and Bhojpuri. Their traditional occupation is textile dyeing and printing. Unlike Uttar Pradesh, there is no distinct caste of printers, both occupations being done by the Rangrez. The majority of the Rangrez in Bihar however no longer practice their traditional occupation. Many Rangrez are now petty businessmen, while some are cultivators.

In Gujarat 
In Gujarat, they are found in many districts like, Surat, Ahmedabad, Vadodara, Ankleshwar, Patan and Wagda. Some are doing the old traditional occupation. In Vadodara they were situated at the time of Sir Sayajirao Gaekwad. Some lived in Patan at the time of Siddhraj Jaysing, more them 200 years. In Patan is the place name "Rangrej Ki Khadaki". They are also called "Anjuman Patni Rangrez".

See also
 Ranghar
 Muslim Rajput

References

Muslim communities of India
Social groups of Pakistan
Social groups of Rajasthan
Social groups of Uttar Pradesh
Social groups of Bihar
Muslim communities of Bihar
Shaikh clans
Muslim communities of Rajasthan
Muslim communities of Uttar Pradesh
Muslim communities of Gujarat